A dachshund is a short-legged, long-bodied, hound-type dog breed.

Dachshund may also refer to:

 Dachshund (building in Warsaw), a building in Warsaw, Poland
 Dachshund (gene)
 Miniature Dachshund, a miniature version of the previously mentioned dog breed
 Dachshund racing, a form of dog racing